National Motor Museum may refer to:

National Motor Museum, Beaulieu, England
National Motor Museum, Birdwood, South Australia